Anthony Albert Less (born August 31, 1937) was a vice admiral in the United States Navy. He was Commander Naval Air Force, U.S. Atlantic Fleet from 1991 to 1994. He is an alumnus of Leetonia High School in Leetonia, Ohio and Heidelberg University in Tiffin, Ohio.

After flight training, Less was designated a naval aviator in June 1961. He then served with VA-43, VA-86 and VA-44 flying the A-4 Skyhawk. VA-86 was deployed on the carrier  based at Norfolk, Virginia. Transitioning to the A-7 Corsair, he served with VA-174, VA-105 and then VA-174 again. VA-105 was deployed on the carrier  for combat operations in Southeast Asia during the Vietnam War.

In April 1971, Less joined VA-12 and became executive officer. He then served as commanding officer of the squadron from June 1972 to October 1973. Less served as commanding officer of the Naval Flight Demonstration Squadron from November 1973 to January 1976. He then joined Carrier Air Wing Nine, serving as commander from August 1976 to December 1977.

Less served as the commanding officer of the replenishment oiler  from December 1979 to July 1981 and the carrier  from June 1982 to July 1983. Promoted to rear admiral, he was given command of Carrier Group One from August 1987 to December 1987 and Joint Task Force Middle East from January 1988 to April 1989.

His awards include the Defense Distinguished Service Medal, Navy Distinguished Service Medal (with gold star in lieu of second award), Defense Superior Service Medal (with oak leaf cluster in lieu of second award), Legion of Merit (with gold star in lieu of second award), Air Medal with 10 strike/flight awards, Navy Commendation Medal with Combat "V", joint Meritorious Unit Award, Navy Unit Commendation and Navy "E" Ribbon. In retirement he served a stint as President of the Association of Naval Aviation.

References

1937 births
Living people
People from Salem, Ohio
Heidelberg University (Ohio) alumni
United States Naval Aviators
United States Navy personnel of the Vietnam War
Recipients of the Air Medal
United States Navy admirals
Recipients of the Legion of Merit
Recipients of the Defense Superior Service Medal
Recipients of the Navy Distinguished Service Medal
Recipients of the Defense Distinguished Service Medal